The Muscular Dystrophy Association (MDA) is an American 501(c)(3) umbrella organization that works to support people with neuromuscular diseases. Founded in 1950 by Paul Cohen, who lived with muscular dystrophy, it works to combat neuromuscular disorders by funding research, providing medical and community services and educating health professionals and the general public and contributed more than $1 billion toward researching therapies and cures, helping to fund the identification of the dystrophin gene responsible for Duchenne muscular dystrophy as well as prospective treatments.

Renowned for The Jerry Lewis Telethon, the annual Labor Day telecast aired live from 1966 to 2010 and was hosted by Jerry Lewis, who also served as MDA's national chairman. Don Rickles, Frank Sinatra, Sammy Davis, Jr., Milton Berle, Wayne Newton, Norm Crosby, Don Francisco, Tony Orlando, Johnny Carson, Aretha Franklin, Maureen McGovern, Diana Ross, Angela Lansbury and others have also supported MDA over the years. The organization's headquarters is in Chicago, Illinois.

History 
The organization was founded in 1950 by a group with personal connections to muscular dystrophy, including Paul Cohen who lived with the disease. Originally known as the Muscular Dystrophy Associations of America, it was renamed to its present name in the 1970s.

In 1954, MDA began its partnership with the International Association of Fire Fighters for its annual Fill the Boot fundraising drive. In 1955, the organization held its first summer camp.

In 1980, American motorcycle manufacturer Harley Davidson became an MDA National Sponsor; in 1987 the MDA Ride For Life program began, a fundraising motorcycle ride held over Labor Day weekend. In 1986, oil and gas provider Citgo became a second national sponsor of the organization.

In 1982, the MDA Shamrocks program launched in Grand Rapids, Michigan, and became a national program one year later. In 1996, MDA and Lewis were jointly honored by the American Medical Association with a lifetime achievement awards for their contributions to the health and welfare of humanity.

In October 2020, the MDA Telethon, which had originally run from 1966 to 2014, was reimagined as The MDA Kevin Hart Kids Telethon after a six-year hiatus. The two-hour event was held virtually due to the COVID-19 pandemic, and streamed live on the Laugh Out Loud network and its YouTube channel. Celebrity guests for the 2020 telethon included Jack Black, Josh Gad, Michael B. Jordan, and Jillian Mercado.

In November 2020, MDA launched a tool, called the neuroMuscular ObserVational Research (MOVR) Visualization and Reporting Platform (VRP), to help make clinical data more accessible and accelerate discovery of muscular dystrophy treatments.

In response to the COVID-19 pandemic, MDA converted several of its traditional programs to virtual formats and introduced new virtual programming. The latter included several Facebook Live events discussing challenges that the pandemic placed on people with disabilities. It also provided COVID-19 resources and recommendations for neuromuscular patients and providers via its online resource center. Throughout stay at home orders due to the COVID-19 pandemic, MDA shared a "joke of the day" from National Ambassador Ethan Lybrand via their social media channels.

January 2021, MDA announced Indianapolis Colts running back Nyheim Hines as its national spokesperson.

National Goodwill Ambassador 
Each year (sometimes for multiple-year stretches), a child affected by a muscle disease is chosen to be the MDA's "National Goodwill Ambassador", which, until the 1980s, were referred to as "poster children". In 1952, the MDA inaugurated Michael Danna as its first Poster Child. One of the most well-known ambassadors was Mattie Stepanek, the National Goodwill Ambassador from 2002 until his death in 2004, notable for his best-selling Heartsongs series of poetry books, and his appearances on The Oprah Winfrey Show and Good Morning America. More recent National Goodwill Ambassadors have been 12-year-old Bryson Foster (2012–2013) of Concord, North Carolina, who is affected by Duchenne muscular dystrophy and 9-year-old Reagan Imhoff of New Berlin, Wisconsin.

Research 
In 1986, MDA-funded researcher Louis M. Kunkel identified the dystrophin gene, the gene for Duchenne muscular dystrophy (DMD) and Becker muscular dystrophy (BMD). MDA funded the first gene therapy trial in 1999, followed by the first vector based gene therapy trial for DMD in 2006.

In 2007, MDA funded Adrian R. Krainer and his colleagues at the Cold Spring Harbor Laboratory in Laurel Hollow, New York for the early-stage development of nusinersen. Nusinersen became FDA approved in 2016 as the first treatment for spinal muscular dystrophy (SMA).

As of 2018, MDA had a total funding commitment of more than $58 million distributed among 312 research grants. By 2019, MDA supported 252 research projects worldwide, totaling a funding commitment of more than $66 million.

Programs and events

Fill the Boot Drive 
Since 1954, MDA has partnered with the International Association of Fire Fighters (IAFF) for the annual Fill the Boot Drive, where firefighters around the country ask those passing to donate to MDA via one of their boots. In 2016, over 100,000 firefighters from 1,507 different IAFF locals participated, raising over $24 million.

Telethon 

Debuting in 1966 and held annually on Labor Day weekend until 2014, the telethon was originally hosted by veteran film star, comedian and singer Jerry Lewis, who also served as the MDA's national chairman since its inception in 1950 and hosted the show until 2010. In 2005, the MDA made the unprecedented decision to pledge $1 million of the telethon's money raised to Hurricane Katrina disaster relief, making the donation specifically to the Salvation Army (though the telethon also urged viewers to give to the American Red Cross). In 2008, the annual televised fundraiser raised a record $65,031,393.  Originally broadcast for up to 21½ hours from 1966 to 2010, the event was cut back to six hours in 2011. The 2011 edition of the telethon was originally announced to have been Lewis' last as host, with him continuing his role as national chairman; however, on August 3, 2011, the MDA announced that Lewis resigned as host and chairman, due to circumstances not revealed. However, in 2016, one year before his death, Lewis broke a five-year silence in a video endorsing MDA's redesigned web site and brand, declaring that the work to end muscular dystrophy be continued.

Additionally, Lewis' support was so ironclad over the years that children and adults assisted by MDA are referred to as Jerry's Kids. From 2012 to 2014, the show was known as the MDA Show of Strength. In early 2015, the organization announced it was discontinuing the show.

On September 9, 2020, MDA executives announced plans to relaunch their annual MDA telethon with a new host, comedian Kevin Hart. Entitled The MDA Kevin Hart Kids Telethon, the new two-hour telethon was seen exclusively through participating social media platforms; the event was broadcast October 24, 2020, at 8 p.m. EDT. The special was a dual-charity event, with proceeds going towards both MDA and "Help From The Hart", an organization founded by the aforementioned new host of the program. Hart's charity announced that it will use its portion of funds raised to "support education, health and social needs programs targeting underserved communities and servicing youth through education scholarships." The telethon was accompanied by a 10-hour Let's Play livestream, called Let’s Play For A Cure, which featured DJ and producer Zedd, gaming personality missharvey and esports athletes. The livestream was a part of a week-long "streamathon", which featured esports stars playing games including League of Legends, Rocket League, Fortnite, Call of Duty and Fall Guys.

Following the Kevin Hart Kids Telethon was MDA’s 70th Anniversary Show, hosted by entertainment TV journalists Nancy O’Dell and Jann Carl.

Summer camp 
Every summer, for one week, thousands of children from across the country who have been diagnosed with one of the forty-three muscle diseases covered in MDA's program are able to attend a camp designated for only them. There is a one counselor to one camper ratio and the entire week the children, ages 8–17, are paired with an adult volunteer. They get to participate in fun activities and games and stay overnight. The camps are set up locally and are different weeks throughout the months of May through August. The entire camp staff are volunteer members and are required to interview and apply with good recommendations. The camp is offered at no cost to campers and their families, cost of the camp for the campers and volunteers is covered by the many fundraisers the MDA does each year.

Muscle Walk 
Started in 2010, the MDA Muscle Walk is an annual 1 to 3.1 mile lap event held in over 150 communities across the United States to raise money for research and patient services.

Lock-Up 
MDA's Lock-Up event stages local community leaders as "locked up" behind bars and requires a certain amount of money to "bail" them out.

Shamrocks 
The Shamrock program, focused around Saint Patrick's Day, includes over 125,000 local retail stores participating. For each donation made at the store, a green shamrock is posted inside the store.

Centers 
MDA provides both "Care Centers" across the US and a Resource Center that serves a US audience. MDA’s care center network provides specialized neuromuscular care at more than 150 clinics across the United States. Research is also conducted at these centers. MDA’s Resource Center offers support and educational resources for families and healthcare providers affected by neuromuscular diseases.

Diseases targeted
MDA targets the following muscle-affecting diseases:

 amyotrophic lateral sclerosis
 Becker's muscular dystrophy
 central core disease
 centronuclear myopathy (including myotubular myopathy)
 Charcot–Marie–Tooth disease
 congenital muscular dystrophy
 congenital myasthenic syndrome
 Dejerine–Sottas disease
 dermatomyositis
 Duchenne muscular dystrophy
 Emery–Dreifuss muscular dystrophy
 facioscapulohumeral muscular dystrophy
 Friedreich's ataxia
 hyperthyroid myopathy
 hypothyroid myopathy
 inclusion body myositis
 Lambert–Eaton myasthenic syndrome
 Limb-girdle muscular dystrophy
 mitochondrial myopathy
 myasthenia gravis
 myotonia congenita, both Thomsen's disease and Becker disease
 nemaline myopathy
 paramyotonia congenita
 periodic paralysis, both hypokalemic and hyperkalemic
 polymyositis
 spinal and bulbar muscular atrophy
 spinal muscular atrophy

The organization also targets muscle diseases due to deficiencies in carnitine and the following enzymes:

 phosphorylase
 acid maltase (Pompe's disease)
 phosphofructokinase
 debrancher enzyme (Forbes disease)
 carnitine palmityl transferase
 phosphoglycerate kinase
 phosphoglycerate mutase
 lactate dehydrogenase
 myoadenylate deaminase

Legislation
The MDA supported the Newborn Screening Saves Lives Reauthorization Act of 2013 (H.R. 1281; 113th Congress), a bill that would amend the Public Health Service Act to reauthorize grant programs and other initiatives to promote expanded screening of newborns and children for heritable disorders. The MDA argued that "many of the drug therapies currently under development for MDA's community will be of most benefit if administered either presymptomatically or early in the progression of the disease. Thus, for some of the diseases in MDA's program, the availability of a newborn screening program at the time of treatment availability presents the best opportunity for impacting optimal and potential lifesaving treatment outcomes."

The MDA supported the Paul D. Wellstone Muscular Dystrophy Community Assistance, Research and Education Amendments of 2013 (H.R. 594; 113th Congress), a bill that would amend the Public Health Service Act to revise the muscular dystrophy research program of the National Institutes of Health (NIH). MDA argued that "a great deal of work still needs to be done, and increased federal support is needed to ensure that researchers can continue making progress toward finding a cure."

Charity assessments
According to a Better Business Bureau summary released in September 2015, the Organization:
 oversees a network of 200 hospital-affiliated clinics providing diagnosis and treatment, including more than 40 MDA/ALS centers for Lou Gehrig's disease
 offers diagnostic and follow-up care, support groups, summer camps for children (aged 6–17), and assistance to repairs medical equipment
 funds research for disease treatments and cures
 has a paid staff of 812 people
 received $145.3 million donated because of fund-raising activities, 15% of which was spent on the fund-raising activities.

Charity Navigator, which is the largest independent evaluator of charities, gives MDA one out of four stars based on Financial, Accountability, and Transparency Performance Metrics.

Criticism 

MDA and Lewis were once criticized by disability rights activists for their tendency to paint disabled people as, these advocates say, "pitiable victims who want and need nothing more than a big charity to take care of or cure them."

References

External links and sources 
 Muscular Dystrophy Association's website
 MDA Puerto Rico website 
 Wise Giving Alliance report on MDA from the Better Business Bureau
 The Kids Are All Right, a documentary film critical of the MDA and Jerry Lewis

Organizations established in 1950
Muscular dystrophy organizations
1950 establishments in the United States
Amyotrophic lateral sclerosis
Non-profit organizations based in Chicago